This page details rugby league international match results in 2010.

See also

 International rugby league in 2011

2010 in rugby league
Rugby league-related lists